The Cushing and Hannah Prince House is a historic house at 189 Greely Road in Yarmouth, Maine.  Built in 1785 and substantially remodeled about 1830, it is a fine local example of a rural Federal period farmhouse with Greek Revival features.  It was listed on the National Register of Historic Places in 1999.

Description and history
The Prince House stands in far western Yarmouth, on the northeast side of Greely Road, just north of Maxfield Brook.  It is a -story wood-frame structure, with a side-gable roof, central chimney, clapboard siding, and a granite block foundation.  A long single-story ell extends to the rear.  The main facade is five bays wide, with a central entrance that is framed by sidelight windows and pilasters, with an elliptical fanlight above.  The southeast side has a secondary entrance which features sidelight windows and a Federal period entablature.  The interior follows a typical early Federal period central chimney plan, with the main stairway in front of the chimney, with the parlor to the left, dining room to the right, and a now-modernized kitchen extending across the rear.  A second staircase is located next to the side entrance.  Woodwork on the interior is a mix of Greek Revival and Federal styles, with a particularly fine fireplace mantel surround in the parlor.

He lived in this house with his wife, Hannah (1752–1843).

See also
National Register of Historic Places listings in Cumberland County, Maine
Historical buildings and structures of Yarmouth, Maine

References

Houses on the National Register of Historic Places in Maine
Federal architecture in Maine
Greek Revival architecture in Maine
Houses completed in 1785
Houses in Cumberland County, Maine
Cushing and Hannah Prince House
National Register of Historic Places in Cumberland County, Maine